Ian J. Pearson (born 15 January 1974) is a retired English badminton player.

Achievements

World Junior Championships 
The Bimantara World Junior Championships was an international invitation badminton tournament for junior players. It was held in Jakarta, Indonesia from 1987 to 1991.

Boys' doubles

European Junior Championships 
Boys' doubles

IBF World Grand Prix 
The World Badminton Grand Prix sanctioned by International Badminton Federation (IBF) since 1983.

Men's doubles

IBF International 
Men's doubles

Mixed doubles

References 

1974 births
Living people
English male badminton players